The Gillerberg Observation Tower is a German steel lattice observation tower that was built in 1892. The Gillerberg Observation Tower is one of the oldest lattice towers in Germany and was renovated in 2004. The height of its observation deck is 15 metres above the ground.

History

The Gillerberg Observation Tower was built in the town of Hilchenbach in 1892. In 2004, it was renovated and new features were added, such as a new observation deck.

Geography

The Gillerberg is located in the town of Hilchenbach, in the district of Siegen-Wittgenstein, in the state of North Rhine-Westphalia, the most populous state of Germany. Its postal code is 57271.

See also

Lattice Tower
Observation deck
Gross Reken Melchenberg Radio Tower
Schomberg Observation Tower
Hilchenbach

References

External links
SkyscraperPage Forum

Towers completed in 1892
Buildings and structures in Siegen-Wittgenstein
Observation towers in North Rhine-Westphalia